RNLB Mary Stanford (ON 661) was a Royal National Lifeboat Institution (RNLI) Liverpool-class pulling and sailing type lifeboat stationed in Rye Harbour.

On 15 November 1928 the Mary Stanford capsized, drowning the entire crew of 17. The lifeboat was launched in a south-west gale with heavy rain squalls and heavy seas to the vessel Alice of Riga. News was received that the crew of the Alice had been rescued by another vessel and the recall signal was fired three times. Apparently, the lifeboat crew had not seen it. As the lifeboat finally came back into harbour she was seen to capsize and the whole of the crew perished.

Previous service

About every 10–15 years the RNLI lifeboats around the coast of Britain and Ireland are replaced with new boats as a matter of course. Some stations stay with the same class of boat and others are upgraded to the new improved versions of what they have had, or downgraded to a more suitable class to carry out the work that they have been doing with the old boat. It is traditional for crews to be asked for their view on the type of boat supplied.

In May 1914 a new lifeboat was offered to Rye Harbour to replace the John William Dudly a self-righting 10-oar pulling and sailing Liverpool class in service since 1900. At the invitation of the Institution the then coxswain, William Southerden, and two of the crew were invited to visit three lifeboat stations and inspect the different types of boats, doing similar work to that of the Rye Harbour boat. In July they visited Cromer and witnessed an exercise launch of the Louisa Heartwell. The one chosen was a 38 ft (11.7 m) Liverpool non-self-righting pulling and sailing boat with 14 oars. This was thought to be the ideal craft to operate in the surf conditions of Rye Bay. Also, according to the brother of one of those lost, the crew rejected a self-righting boat as it would have been too heavy to drag across the shingle and launch.

S. E. Saunders of East Cowes was the builder and on 13 April 1916 she was tested for draught and stability and found to be 'perfectly satisfactory'. The cost of the lifeboat was met by a legacy in memory of Mary Stanford, after whom the boat was named. After the loss, a donation by John Frederick Stanford, son of Mary Stanford, paid for another lifeboat to be named Mary Stanford, built, in 1930, by Saunders-Roe of East Cowes - RNLB Mary Stanford (ON 733) had an illustrious career saving 122 lives.

The lifeboat was sailed from East Cowes and was placed on station at Rye Harbour on 19 October 1916. On 25 November of that year, she was launched on exercise in weather conditions that 'fairly tested her'. The coxswain, crew and officers of the Institution were satisfied with the result of the exercise. In 1920 the RNLI sent out a circular to all lifeboat crews around the country asking what type of lifebelt was preferred. The crew at Rye expressed a preference for the No 3 Lifebelt – the Kapok. Exhaustive experiments had been made up to September 1917 by the Institution, with co-operation with the Board of Trade and their officers, to ensure that Jackets of No 3 pattern fulfilled the purposes for which they were designed. The belts had fulfilled the purposes under the conditions of the experiment.

During her twelve years at Rye Harbour the Mary Stanford was launched 63 times, 47 launches were exercises and sixteen were call-outs when ten lives were saved. On one of these, on 12 December 1923, an aeroplane ditched in the sea off Fairlight. The lifeboat towed the plane back to station, but the pilot, an American, L.B. Sperry, was lost when he had tried to swim ashore before the lifeboat arrived on scene. During her time she had three coxswains. The first was William Southerden, who took delivery of the vessel in 1916 and was coxswain until 1919. He was followed by Joseph White until 1924, when Herbert Head took over unto 1928.

Circumstances

Incident
On the night of 14 November 1928 a south-west gale swept up the Channel with winds in excess of 80 mph (128 km/h). Just after 4:00 am on the 15th, the small Steamer Alice of Riga, laden with a cargo of bricks, was in collision with the larger German vessel Smyrna. In the collision the Alice lost her rudder and had a hole torn in her side. The weather was then too bad for the Smyrna to effect a rescue, and at 4:27 am the Ramsgate Coastguard Station received a message passed on by North Foreland Radio – "Steamer. Alice of Riga. Leaking. Danger. Drifting SW to W 8 miles from Dungeness 04.30". The Rye Harbour Coast Guard Station was informed at 04:55 am, and maroons were fired just after 5 am to summon the lifeboat crew.

The lifeboat crew responded to the maroons. It was practically low water and, in the severe weather, it took three attempts to get the boat away, at 06:45. All of the crew by now would have been wet through. It was just beginning to break daylight, when at 06:50 Rye Coastguard received the message saying that the crew of the Alice of Riga had been rescued by the Smyrna. This message had originally been received by Ramsgate Coastguard Station at 6:12 am. As it was not a 'life saving message' it was not considered to be 'entitled', i.e. priority. There was then a further delay in sending the recall to Rye Coastguard when an attempt to call Dungeness via Lydd proved futile.

The recall reached Rye Harbour lifeboat station just 5 minutes after the Mary Stanford had been launched. Flares were fired to recall the lifeboat but, due to the severe conditions, they were not seen. At around 09:00 the mate of the S.S. Halton saw the lifeboat 3 miles (5 km) W.S.W from Dungeness and all appeared well. A bit later the lifeboat was also seen by a boy sailor on the Smyrna. About 10:30 a young boy, Cecil Marchant, collecting drift wood at Camber saw the lifeboat capsize. He told his parents who reported it to Jurys Gap Coastguard. Soon rumours were going around Rye Harbour village that the boat had 'gone over', and the vicar thought that he had seen this from an upstairs window at the Vicarage. By 12 noon it had been confirmed as the lifeboat could be seen bottom up floating towards the shore. Within ten minutes, Rye Harbour Coastguard was informed and the maroons were fired to assemble the launchers. It is said that over 100 men rushed to the shore where the upturned lifeboat lay. A tank was brought along from Lydd Camp to right the lifeboat. Over the next two hours the bodies of the crew were washed up, a total of 15 on that day, with efforts made to revive the bodies. They were taken to Lydd for formal identification.

Aftermath
Eva Southerden, 15 at the time, remembers her father Charles, returning home that night and breaking down as he told his wife he could not see Charlie (Charlie was found later that night). There was speculation as to the cause of the capsize and it was unclear why the lifeboat was in the position where it capsized. It is unlikely that it was making for Rye Harbour, as the boathouse is  miles to the west. Also, in these prevailing weather conditions, it was usual for the lifeboat to shelter east of Dungeness or go into Folkestone. A popular view why the lifeboat was in that position was that either John Head or Henry Cutting, or both, had been washed out of the boat and that the lifeboat was looking for them.

On the evening of the following day, an inquest was opened at Rye Town Hall, with the Rye Borough Coroner Dr. T. Harrett presiding. The seaworthiness of the lifeboat and competence of the crew were called into question, but it was emphatically stated that the boat and her crew were absolutely efficient. After evidence of identification and eyewitness accounts were given, the inquest was adjourned until the following evening, when accusations were made about the suitability of the lifejackets. They were said to be perished and worn. As a result, they had become waterlogged and would weigh a man down and drown him. In response the RNLI stated that the Kapok No 3 Lifejacket was adopted by the RNLI in 1917 and were delivered to Rye Harbour in September of that year. The lifejackets were tried in a heavy gale on 30 October 1917, and later voted 11 – 6 by the crew as being the most preferred type. The Coroner recorded a verdict of death by accident. In response to the accusations, the RNLI asked the Board of Trade to hold a full enquiry into the disaster.

On Tuesday 20 November the funeral was held of fifteen of the crew, buried in a communal grave. Hundreds of mourners from all over the country attended. Members of the Latvian Government were among the dignitaries present, recognising that the men had lost their lives going to the assistance of a Latvian vessel. When Henry Cutting's body was found at Eastbourne 3 months later, it was bought back home and interred with his fellow crew members. John Head's body was never recovered.

The Board of Trade Court of Enquiry sat at Rye Town Hall on 19, 20 and 21 December and the following 1, 2 and 4 January. After their deliberation the court announced:

"As there were no survivors of the crew, the cause of the Lifeboat capsizing is a matter of conjecture, but from the evidence available we are of the opinion that whilst attempting to make the Harbour on a strong flood tide and in high and dangerous breaking sea, she was suddenly capsized and the crew were thrown into the water, two men being entangled under the boat. The broken water and heavy surf caused the loss of the crew".

The Mary Stanford remained at Rye Harbour until the inquiry was over. In January 1929 she was taken to the RNLI depot at Poplar in east London, where she was broken up.

The dependants of those who died were pensioned by the RNLI, with the local fund raising over £35,000.

Memorials
A memorial tablet made of Manx stone was presented to Rye Harbour by the people of the Isle of Man.

A memorial stained glass window was placed in Winchelsea Church. It depicts a lifeboat putting out to a ship in distress while figures on the shore watch as it goes. For photo of window see this link...

The seventeen men who lost their lives were Herbert Head (47), coxswain, and two sons James Alfred (19) and John Stanley (17); Joseph Stonham (43), 2nd Coxswain; Henry Cutting (39), Bowman and his two brothers Roberts Redvers (28) and Albert Ernest (26); Charles Frederick David (28), Robert Henry (23) and Lewis Alexander (21) Pope, three brothers; William Thomas Albert (27) and Leslie George (24) Clark, brothers; Arthur George (25) and Maurice James (23) Downey, cousins; Albert Ernest Smith (44), Walter Igglesden (37) and Charles Southerden (22).

The Mary Stanford in fiction
Monica Edwards wrote a fictional account of the lifeboat disaster in her children's novel Storm Ahead, which was published in 1953. She had witnessed the disaster at first hand: her father, the Reverend Harry Newton, was vicar of Rye Harbour at the time and officiated at the mass funeral. Monica was known to have been close friends with Charlie Southerden who died on the lifeboat.

Song for the Mary Stanford 
Allen Maslen of Warwickshire folk rock band Meet on the Ledge wrote a song dedicated to the Mary Stanford. It is featured on their album The Portuguese Handshake. It is also available on the Charity CD "Someone was Calling" a compilation album with a nautical theme featuring artists who have appeared at Cromer's Folk on the Pier Festival.

References

External links
Rye Heritage Centre
Rye Harbour Lifeboat Station
Rye Harbour Image Library
Rye Harbour Lifeboat Disaster – Facebook Community Site

Liverpool-class lifeboats
Maritime incidents in the United Kingdom
Maritime incidents in 1928
1928 disasters in the United Kingdom
Icklesham